Bharatiya National Janata Dal is a political party in India. It is a splinter group of Janata Dal. It was founded by V.M. Gajera.

References 

Political parties in India